New Hampshire's 5th State Senate district is one of 24 districts in the New Hampshire Senate. It has been represented by Democrat Suzanne Prentiss since 2020, succeeding fellow Democrat Martha Hennessey.

Geography
District 5 covers parts of western Grafton and Sullivan Counties, including the towns of Canaan, Charlestown, Claremont, Cornish, Enfield, Hanover, Lebanon, Lyme, and Plainfield.

The district is located entirely within New Hampshire's 2nd congressional district. It borders the state of Vermont.

Recent election results

2020

2018

2016

2014

2012

Federal and statewide results in District 5

Historical election results
These results happened prior to 2012 redistricting, and thus occurred under different district lines.

2010

References

5
Grafton County, New Hampshire
Sullivan County, New Hampshire